The 2007 WAFL season was the 123rd season of the various incarnations of the West Australian Football League. The season saw Subiaco, confounding the critics who expected them to slip after winning their second premiership in three years, win their second consecutive premiership for the first time in ninety-four seasons, with injury-plagued forward Brad Smith overcoming two reconstructions that wiped out 2005 and 2006 to kick 126 goals for the season, the most in the WAFL since Warren Ralph kicked 128 for Claremont in 1983. Smith also achieved the unique feat for a full-forward of winning the Simpson Medal in the Grand Final.

The top three teams between 2004 and 2006 – the Lions, Claremont and South Fremantle – maintained their tight grip in 2007, though there were notable improvements from East Fremantle, who had won a mere nineteen games between 2003 and 2006 but rose to nine victories in 2007, and East Perth, who returned to the finals for the first time in four seasons. Claremont won eighteen of nineteen matches after two opening losses before their inexperience told against the hardened Lions in the Grand Final, resulting in a short but quite steep fall in the following two seasons.

Home-and-away season

Round 1

Round 2

Round 3 (Easter weekend)

Round 4

Round 5

Round 6

Round 7

Round 8

Round 9

Round 10 (Foundation Day)

Round 11

Round 12

Round 13

Round 14

Round 15

Round 16

Round 17

Round 18

Round 19

Round 20

Round 21

Round 22

Round 23

Ladder

Finals

First semi-final

Second semi-final

Preliminary final

This was also the last preliminary final held at Subiaco Oval From 2008 it was moved to the loser of the major semi final.

Grand Final

References

External links
Official WAFL website
West Australian Football League (WAFL) Season 2007

West Australian Football League seasons
WAFL